Peter Barber may refer to:
 Peter J. Barber (1830–1905), American carpenter and architect in Santa Barbara, California
 Peter Barber (architect), modernist British architect